Bernard Rudolf "Ben" Bot (born 21 November 1937) is a retired Dutch politician and diplomat of the Christian Democratic Appeal (CDA).

He served as Minister of Foreign Affairs from 3 December 2003 until 22 February 2007 in the Cabinets Balkenende II and III. A career diplomat, he succeeded then-Minister of Foreign Affairs Jaap de Hoop Scheffer who resigned to become Secretary General of NATO in 2003.

Early life and education
Bot was born in Batavia, Dutch East Indies (now Jakarta, Indonesia). The son of Theo Bot who served as Minister of Education, Culture and Science and Minister for Development Cooperation. He studied at the Leiden University where he earned an L.L.M. and a Ph.D. degree in law, and attended subsequently The Hague Academy of International Law and Harvard Law School (Cambridge, Massachusetts, United States) where he received a second L.L.M. degree from the latter.

Politics 

He served in the Ministry of Foreign Affairs from 1963 to 2002, including postings at the Permanent Representation of the Netherlands to the European Community from 1964 to 1970, the Netherlands embassy in Buenos Aires to 1973, and at the embassy in former East-Berlin in the DDR. In the period 1976-1982 he worked in the Netherlands for the Ministry of Foreign Affairs in The Hague, after which he was Deputy Permanent Representative of the Netherlands to the North Atlantic Treaty Organization (NATO) in Brussels.

From 1986 to 1989, Bot was Ambassador of the Netherlands to Turkey. He served as Secretary-General of the Ministry of Foreign Affairs in The Hague until 1992, when he was appointed as Permanent Representative of the Netherlands to the European Union in Brussels. He held that post for an unusually long period of 10 years.

On 3 December 2003, Bot succeeded former NATO Secretary-General Jaap de Hoop Scheffer as Minister of Foreign Affairs in the second Balkenende cabinet. Bot is a member of the Christen Democratisch Appèl (CDA) party. In February 2007 he was succeeded as foreign minister by Maxime Verhagen in the fourth Balkenende cabinet. Currently, Bot is a partner of the Praaning Meines Consultancy Group and holds various public posts including President of the Netherlands Institute for Multiparty Democracy and Chairman of the Board of the Clingendael Institute in The Hague.

Political positions
Bot voiced concern over the 2006 Lebanon War. Bot has expressed "understanding for Israel's reaction" but said "it would be hard to support Israel in case there will be many civilian casualties".

Bot was interviewed by the NRC Handelsblad newspaper in December 2007, where he reiterated his 2005 position that the 2003 invasion of Iraq was a mistake, and that he had to "redress" his comment in 2005 after heavy pressure from prime minister Jan Peter Balkenende. In response, Balkenende said that he would have asked Bot to step down if he did not revise his position at the time.

Other activities
 European Bank for Reconstruction and Development (EBRD), Ex-Officio Alternate Member of the Board of Governors (2003-2007)

Decorations

References

External links

Official
  Dr. B.R. (Ben) Bot Parlement & Politiek

1937 births
Living people
Ambassadors of the Netherlands to Turkey
Ambassadors of the Netherlands to East Germany
Christian Democratic Appeal politicians
Commanders of the Order of Merit of the Republic of Poland
Dutch expatriates in the United States
Dutch expatriates in Belgium
Dutch expatriates in Argentina
Dutch expatriates in Germany
Dutch expatriates in Turkey
Dutch lobbyists
Dutch nonprofit directors
Dutch nonprofit executives
Dutch Roman Catholics
Dutch people of Indonesian descent
Dutch prisoners of war in World War II
Harvard Law School alumni
The Hague Academy of International Law people
Indo people
Leiden University alumni
Ministers of Foreign Affairs of the Netherlands
People from Batavia, Dutch East Indies
Politicians from The Hague
Permanent Representatives of the Netherlands to the European Union
Permanent Representatives of the Netherlands to NATO
Officers of the Order of Orange-Nassau
World War II civilian prisoners held by Japan
20th-century Dutch civil servants
20th-century Dutch diplomats
20th-century Dutch politicians
21st-century Dutch civil servants
21st-century Dutch diplomats
21st-century Dutch politicians
Diplomats from The Hague